Western Jicaque, also known as Jicaque of El Palmar and Sula, now extinct, was a Jicaquean language spoken around El Palmar, Cortés Department, near Chamelecón in Honduras.

References

Jicaquean languages
Languages of Honduras
Indigenous languages of the Americas